Dunkard Fork Wildlife Management Area is located on  in Marshall County near Moundsville, West Virginia.  Mixed hardwoods cover most of the former Jacob Crow (1815-1901) (later C.C. Mooney [d. 1970] farm, site, whose major focus is a flood control lake on Dunkard Fork Wheeling Creek. The rolling terrain is punctuated with a few highwalls and ponds.  Dunkard Fork WMA is located in northeast Marshall County along the Pennsylvania line on County Route 15. Construction of the dam was originally slated for a location upstream, but was later moved into West Virginia. Construction was underway by 1991 and the Jacob Crow farm was ruined. Archeological digs were conducted and photographs taken to document the site before the structures were razed.

Hunting and Fishing

Hunting opportunities are limited by the small size of the area.  Available hunting can include deer, grouse,  squirrel, turkey and waterfowl. Fishing opportunities in the  Dunkard Fork Lake include tiger musky, black bass, hybrid striped bass, bluegill and channel catfish, as well as stocked trout. A small portion of the lake headwaters extend into Pennsylvania.

Camping is prohibited on the Dunkard Fork WMA land.  Only electric motors may be used on boats.

See also
Animal conservation
Fishing
Hunting
List of West Virginia wildlife management areas

References

External links
 West Virginia DNR District 1 Wildlife Management Areas
West Virginia Hunting Regulations
West Virginia Fishing Regulations

Wildlife management areas of West Virginia
Protected areas of Marshall County, West Virginia
IUCN Category V